Remedios may refer to:

Places
 Remedios, Cuba, a municipality in the province of Villa Clara, Cuba
 Remedios, Antioquia, a municipality in Antioquia Department, Colombia
 Remedios, Chiriquí, a corregimiento of Panama
 Remedios District, district (distrito) of Chiriquí Province in Panama
 Remédios, civil parish in the Azores, Portugal
 Los Remedios, a district of Seville, Andalusia, Spain
 Los Remedios National Park in Mexico

People
 Remedios Amaya (born 1962), Spanish singer
 Remedios Varo (1908–1963), Spanish-Mexican para-surrealist painter and anarchist
 Alberto Remedios (1935–2016), British operatic tenor
 Jeffrey Remedios, Canadian businessman, president of Universal Music Canada